Ascetophantes is a monotypic genus of Asian dwarf spiders containing the single species, Ascetophantes asceticus. It was first described by A. V. Tanasevitch & Michael I. Saaristo in 2006, and has only been found in Nepal.

See also
 List of Linyphiidae species

References

Linyphiidae
Monotypic Araneomorphae genera
Spiders of Asia
Taxa named by Michael Saaristo